Bruno Zago (born 2 December 1919) is an Italian retired footballer. He was born in Koper.

External links
Profile on Storiainter.com

1919 births
Possibly living people
Association football midfielders
Inter Milan players
Italian footballers
Serie A players
Sportspeople from Koper
Istrian Italian people